Barragán, or Barragan in English-speaking countries, is a Spanish surname of Galician origins, from where they went to Extremadura, Spain, and even into Alentejo and Estremadura, in Portugal, where the surname was changed into Barragano, Barregano, Barregão, Barregoso, Barregosa (feminine), Varregoso, Varregosa (feminine).

It may refer to: 
 Antonio Barragán (born 1987), Spanish footballer
 Bernabé Barragán (born 1993), Spanish footballer
 Claudio Barragán (born 1964), Spanish footballer
 Cuno Barragan (born 1932), American baseball player
 Eduardo Barragán (born 1951), Colombian boxer
 Fernando Elizondo Barragán (born 1949), Mexican politician
 Gilberto Barragán Balderas (born 1970), Mexican drug lord
 Hernando Barragán (born 1974), Colombian interdisciplinary artist, designer, and academic
 Ismael Barragán (born 1986), Spanish footballer
 Javier Lozano Barragán (1933-2022), Mexican Roman Catholic cardinal
 Jonathan Barragán (born 1985), Spanish professional motocross racer
 Juan Carlos Barragán (born 1973), Mexican politician
 Julio Barragán (1928–2011), Argentine painter
 Luis Barragán (1902–1988), Mexican architect
 Luis Barragán (1914–2009), Argentine painter
 Luis Barragan (executive) (1971–2006), American businessman and philanthropist
 Martín Barragán (born 1991), Mexican professional footballer
 Martín Peláez Barragán, Leonese master of the Order of Santiago between 1217 and 1221
 Miguel Barragán (1790–1844), Mexican general and politician
 Nahuel Barragán (born 1996), Argentine footballer 
 Nanette Barragán (born 1976), American politician
 Nieves Barragán Mohacho, Spanish chef
 Rodolfo Barragán Schwarz (1931–2017), Mexican architect
 Santiago Barragán (born 1987), Spanish motorcycle racer

Spanish-language surnames